Macanese patois, known as  to its speakers, is a Portuguese-based creole language with a substrate from Cantonese, Malay and Sinhala, which was originally spoken by the Macanese community of the Portuguese colony of Macau. It is now spoken by a few families in Macau and in the Macanese diaspora.

UNESCO’s Atlas of the World's Languages in Danger classifies Patua as a "critically endangered" and places the number of speakers at 50 as of the year 2000.

Name
In Chinese it is called "" ("Macanese native-born Portuguese language").

The terms "" ("Macanese speak") and "" ("Macanese native-born Portuguese language") in Chinese (Cantonese), the lingua franca of Macau, refers to any language of Macau (such as the Tanka dialect of Yue Chinese, Standard Cantonese with Macau unique phrases and expressions, Macanese, Portuguese with Macau accent, Hakka, etc.) and the Macanese language, respectively. Although there have been attempts by the Portuguese Macau government in the mid-1990s to redefine the Portuguese and English term "" as Macau Permanent Resident (anyone born in Macau regardless of ethnicity, language, religion or nationality), in accordance with the Chinese (Cantonese) usage, this did not succeed. Consequently, the Portuguese and English term "" refers neither to the indigenous people of Macau (Tanka people) nor to the demonym of Macau, but to a distinctive ethnicity (1.2% of the population) special to Macau.

History

Origins
Patuá arose in Macau after the territory was occupied by Portugal in the mid-16th century and became a major hub of the Portuguese naval, commercial, and religious activities in East Asia.

The language developed first mainly among the descendants of Portuguese settlers. These often married women from Portuguese Malacca, Portuguese India and Portuguese Ceylon rather than from neighbouring China, so the language had strong Malay and Sinhala influence from the beginning. In the 17th century it was further influenced by the influx of immigrants from other Portuguese colonies in Asia, especially from Portuguese Malacca, Indonesia, and Portuguese Ceylon, that had been displaced by the Dutch expansion in the East Indies, and Japanese Christian refugees.

Evolution
Like any other language, Macanese underwent extensive changes in usage, grammar, syntax, and vocabulary over the centuries, in response to changes in Macau's demographics and cultural contacts. Some linguists see a sharp distinction between the "archaic" Macanese, spoken until the early 19th century, and the "modern" form that was strongly influenced by Cantonese. The modern version arose in the late 19th century, when Macanese men began marrying Chinese women from Macau and its hinterland in the Pearl River delta. The British occupation of Hong Kong from the mid-19th century also added many English words to the lexicon.

Over its history the language also acquired elements from several other Indian tongues and a string of other European and Asian languages. These varied influences made Macanese a unique "cocktail" of European and Asian languages.

Macanese lawyer and Patuá supporter Miguel Senna Fernandes has said that Patuá was "not yet dead, but the archaic form of Patuá has already died," adding that "modern" Patuá could be considered a "dialect derived from archaic Patuá." He also underlined the fact that "modern" Patuá has been strongly influenced by Cantonese, namely since the beginning of the 20th century, adding that it was "quite a miracle" that Patuá has been able to survive for four centuries in Macau, considering that "Chinese culture is quite absorbing."

"Let's revive an almost lost memory," Fernandes said about efforts by Patuá aficionados to ensure the survival of Macau's "sweet language" that, after all, is part of its unique history.

Cultural importance
The language played an important role in Macau's social and commercial development between the 16th and 19th centuries, when it was the main language of communication among Macau's Eurasian residents. However, even during that period the total number of speakers was relatively small, probably always amounting to just thousands, not tens of thousands of people.

Macanese continued to be spoken as the mother tongue of several thousand of people, in Macau, Hong Kong and elsewhere, through 19th and early 20th century. At that time, Macanese speakers were consciously using the language in opposition to the standard Portuguese of the metropolitan administration. In the early 20th century, for example, it was the vehicle of satirical sketches poking fun at Portuguese authorities. A few writers, such as the late poet José dos Santos Ferreira ("Adé"), chose the "sweet language" as their creative medium.

On the other hand, Macanese never enjoyed any official status, and was never formally taught in Macau. Starting in the late 19th century, its role in the life of the colony was greatly diminished by the central government's drive to establish standard Portuguese throughout its territories. High-society Macanese gradually stopped using it in the early 20th century, because of its perceived "low class" status as a "primitive Portuguese". All people, including many Chinese learning Portuguese as their second or third language, are required to learn standard European Portuguese.

Present status
Macanese use was already in decline while Macau was a Portuguese territory, and that situation is unlikely to improve now that the territory is under Chinese administration. Still, its speakers take great pride in the fact that Macau has its own local language, something that Hong Kong does not have. They argue that Macau's unique status as a 500-year-old bridge between Orient and the Occident justifies deliberate efforts to preserve the Macanese language. The language is included in UNESCO's Atlas of the World's Languages in Danger.

In spite of its unique character and centuries-old history, Macanese has received scant attention from linguists. Philologist Graciete Nogueira Batalha (1925–1992) published a number of papers on the language. A Macanese-Portuguese glossary was published in 2001.

Geographic distribution 
Macanese is the now nearly extinct native language of the so-called Macanese people, Macau's Eurasian minority, which presently comprises some 8,000 residents in Macau (about 2% of its population), and an estimated 20,000 emigrants and their descendants, especially in Hong Kong, Brazil, California, Canada, Peru, Costa Rica, Australia, Portugal and Paria peninsula of Venezuela. Even within that community, Macanese is actively spoken by just several dozen elderly individuals, mostly women in their eighties or nineties, in Macau and Hong Kong, and only a few hundred people among the Macanese Diaspora overseas, namely in California.

Description

Classification and related languages
Macanese is a creole language, that is, the result of a fusion of several languages and local innovations that became the mother tongue of a community. As such, it is difficult to classify within any major family.

Because of its historical development, it is closely related to other Portuguese- and Malay-influenced creoles of Southeast Asia, notably the Kristang language of Malacca and the extinct Portuguese-influenced creoles of Indonesia and Flores, as well as to the Indo-Portuguese creoles of Sri Lanka and India.

Lexicon
Most of the Macanese lexicon derives from Malay, through various Portuguese-influenced creoles (papiás) like the Kristang of Malacca and the creole spoken in the Indonesian island of Flores. Words of Malay origin include sapeca ("coin") and copo-copo ("butterfly").

Many words also came from Sinhala, through the Indo-Portuguese creoles of the Kaffir and Portuguese Burgher communities of Sri Lanka. Some terms derived from other Indian languages through other Indo-Portuguese creoles brought by natives of Portuguese India, these include Konkani and Marathi languages. Examples of words from these sources include fula ("flower") and lacassa ("vermicelli").

Cantonese contributions include amui ("girl") and laissi ("gift of cash"). English-derived terms include adap (from "hard-up", meaning "short of money") and afet ("fat").

The Portuguese contribution to the lexicon came mainly from the dialects of southern Portugal.

Grammar
There has been little scientific research of Macanese grammar, much less on its development between the 16th and 20th centuries. Its grammatical structure seems to incorporate both European and Asian elements.

Like most Asian languages, Macanese lacks definite articles, and does not inflect verbs: for example, io sam means "I am," and ele sam means "he/she is." Macanese also lacks pronoun cases (io means "I," "me" and "mine"), and has a peculiar way of forming possessive adjectives (ilotro-sua means "theirs").

Progressive action (denoted in English by the "-ing" verbal forms) is denoted by a separate particle ta, presumably derived from Portuguese está ("it is"). Completed actions are likewise indicated by the particle ja, presumably from Portuguese já ("right now" or "already").

Reduplication is used to make plural nouns (casa-casa = "houses"), plural adjectives (china-china = "several Chinese people or things"), and emphatic adverbs (cedo-cedo = "very early"), a pattern also found in Malay grammar.

Writing system
Patuá has no standardised orthography.

Examples 
Here is an example of a Patuá poem:
{|
|Patuá
|Portuguese Translation
|English Translation
|-
|Nhonha na jinela
|Moça na janela
|Young lady in the window
|-
|Co fula mogarim
|Com uma flor de jasmim
|With a jasmine flower
|-
|Sua mae tancarera    
|Sua mãe é uma pescadora Chinesa
|Her mother is a Chinese fisherwoman
|-
|Seu pai canarim
|Seu pai é um Indiano Português
|Her father is a Portuguese Indian
|}

Note that "nhonha" is cognate with "nyonya" in Malay/Kristang, both being derived from Portuguese dona (lady).

References

'N.B. A major part of the above article is based on a feature story by Harald Bruning that was published in the Chinese edition of Macau Magazine, produced by Sinofare Co. Ltd for the Macau Government Information Bureau (GCS), in June 2004.

Bibliography

 Batalha, Graciete Nogueira (1974). Língua de Macau: o que foi e o que é. Macau: Centro de Informação e Turism.
 Batalha, Graciete Nogueira (1977). Glossário do dialecto macaense: notas lingüísticas, etnográficas, e folclóricas. Coimbra: Instituto de Estudos Românicos. Revista Portuguesa de Filologia vol. XVII.
 Batalha, Graciete Nogueira (1985).  "Situação e perspectivas do português e dos crioulos de origem portuguesa na Ásia Oriental (Macau, Hong Kong, Singapura, Indonesia)". Congresso sobre a situação actual da língua portuguesa no mundo. Lisboa: Instituto de Cultura e Língua Portuguesa, No. 646 vol. 1, 287-303.
 Batalha, Graciete Nogueira (1988). Suplemento ao glossário do dialecto macaense : novas notas linguísticas, etnográficas e folclóricas.  Macau: Instituto Cultural de Macau.
 Bruning, Harald (2007). "Patua - A procura do reconhecimento internacional." 'Revista Macau,' 16-25. IV Serie - No. 6. Gabinete de Comunicacao Social da Regiao Administrativa Especial de Macau/Delta Edicoes, Lda. Macau: Revista Macau
 Senna Fernandes, Miguel de and Alan Baxter (2004). Maquista Chapado:  Vocabulary and Expressions in Macau's Portuguese Creole.  Macau: Macau International Institute.
 Santos Ferreira, José dos (1978). Papiá Cristâm di Macau: Epitome de gramática comparada e vocabulário: dialecto macaense. Macau: [s.n.]. 
 Tomás, Isabel (1988). "O crioulo macaense. Algumas questões". Revista de Cultura 2/2: 36-48.
 Tomás, Isabel (1990). "Da vida e morte de um crioulo". Revista de Cultura 4/9: 68-79.

External links 

 Macanese Library | Patua Lexicon
 Description of language
 Projecto Memória Macaense
 Língua patuá 
 "Lost Language: How Macau Gambled Away Its Past", The Guardian, 10 January 201

Languages of Macau
Portuguese-based pidgins and creoles
Endangered pidgins and creoles
Portuguese language in Asia